Yokokimthurston is an album released as a collaborative effort by Yoko Ono, Kim Gordon and Thurston Moore, on Chimera Music on 25 September 2012. "Early in the Morning" was released as a single, on 5 June 2012. The cover is from a Kim Gordon painting.

Track listing
All songs written by Kim Gordon, Thurston Moore and Yoko Ono.

"I Missed You Listening" – 9:58
"Running the Risk" – 9:38
"I Never Told You, Did I?" – 7:04
"Mirror Mirror" – 9:45
"Let's Get There" – 9:34
"Early in the Morning" – 14:36

References

Yoko Ono albums
Thurston Moore albums
2012 albums
Collaborative albums